Argyrotegium  is a genus of plants in the family Asteraceae, native to Australia and New Zealand.

 Species
 Argyrotegium fordianum (M.Gray) J.M.Ward & Breitw. - New South Wales, Victoria, Tasmania
 Argyrotegium mackayi (Buchanan) J.M.Ward & Breitw. - New Zealand (North + South), Victoria, Tasmania
 Argyrotegium nitidulum (Hook.f.) J.M.Ward & Breitw. - New Zealand (South), Victoria, Tasmania
 Argyrotegium poliochlorum (N.G.Walsh) J.M.Ward & Breitw. - New South Wales, Victoria, Tasmania

References

Gnaphalieae
Asteraceae genera